This is a list of 2018 UCI Women's Teams and riders for the 2018 in women's road cycling season.

Teams overview
List updated: 3 March 2018

The 2018 UCI Women's Teams are:

Defunct teams
The below lists all teams which folded completely at the end of the 2017 season, or dropped down from UCI level to National level.

Riders

Al Asayl Cycling Team

Alé–Cipollini

Aromitalia Vaiano

Astana Womens Team

Bepink

Bizkaia Durango–Euskadi Murias

Boels–Dolmans

BTC City Ljubljana

Canyon–SRAM

Cervélo–Bigla Pro Cycling

China Liv Pro Cycling

Cogeas–Mettler Pro Cycling Team

Conceria Zabri–Fanini

Cylance Pro Cycling

Doltcini–Van Eyck Sport UCI Women Cycling

Eurotarget–Bianchi–Vitasana

Experza–Footlogix Ladies Cycling Team

FDJ Nouvelle-Aquitaine Futuroscope

Hagens Berman–Supermint

Health Mate–Cyclelive Team

Hitec Products–Birk Sport

Lotto–Soudal Ladies

Minsk Cycling Club

Mitchelton–Scott

Parkhotel Valkenburg Cycling Team

Rally Cycling

S.C. Michela Fanini Rox

Servetto–Stradalli Cycle–Alurecycling

Team Virtu Cycling Women

Team Sunweb

Tibco–Silicon Valley Bank

Thailand Women's Cycling Team

Top Girls Fassa Bortolo

TWENTY20 p/b Sho-Air

UnitedHealthcare Pro Cycling

Valcar–PBM

Wiggle High5 Pro Cycling

WaowDeals Pro Cycling

References

2018